Eriogonum tomentosum, commonly referred to as dogtongue buckwheat or dogtongue wild buckwheat, is a species in the Polygonaceae (smartweed or knotweed) family.

Distribution
It is found in Southeastern US states including Alabama, Florida, Georgia, North Carolina and South Carolina.

See also
 Eriogonum longifolium var. gnaphalifolium

References

External links

 Alabama Plants - Eriogonum tomentosum - with several photos

tomentosum
Flora of the Southeastern United States
Flora of Florida
Flora without expected TNC conservation status